Garudinia acornuta is a moth of the family Erebidae first described by Jeremy Daniel Holloway in 1982. It is found on Peninsular Malaysia, Borneo and Java. The habitat consists of dipterocarp forests, lower montane forests and lowland forests.

References

Cisthenina
Moths described in 1982